Josh Schuster (born 5 May 2001) is a  international rugby league footballer who plays as a er or  for the Manly-Warringah Sea Eagles in the NRL.

Background
Schuster was born in Sydney, Australia to Australian parents of Samoan and German descent. His uncle Peter represented Australia in rugby sevens.

He played junior rugby league for the Mount Pritchard Mounties.

Career

2020
Schuster made his NRL debut in round 17 of the 2020 NRL season for Manly-Warringah against the Wests Tigers; in a 34–32 loss at Brookvale Oval in an NRL game.

2021
In round 5 of the 2021 NRL season, Schuster scored his first try in the NRL in Manly-Warringah's 13–12 win over the New Zealand Warriors. Schuster played 21 games for Manly in the 2021 NRL season including the club's preliminary final loss against South Sydney.

2022
On 9 February, it was announced that Schuster would be ruled out indefinitely from playing after sustaining an ankle injury at pre-season training. He made 13 appearances for Manly in the 2022 NRL season as the club finished 11th on the table and miss out on the finals. Schuster was one of seven players involved in the Manly pride jersey player boycott.

References

External links
Sea Eagles profile

2001 births
Living people
Australian sportspeople of Samoan descent
Australian people of German descent
Australian rugby league players
Rugby league five-eighths
Rugby league locks
Rugby league players from Sydney
Manly Warringah Sea Eagles players